This list of 2022 motorsport champions is a list of national or international motorsport series with championships decided by the points or positions earned by a driver from multiple races where the season was completed during the 2022 calendar year.

Drag racing

Drift

Motorcycle racing

Motocross

Rally raid

Open wheel racing

Rally

Rally raid

Rallycross

Stock car racing

Sports car and GT

Touring cars

Truck racing

Notes

References

Champions
2022